STARMAD (space tool for advanced and rapid mission analysis and design) deals with the latest trend in the space industry is towards space missions, spacecraft, systems and products, which require quick solutions for system design and software development.

Fundamental aspects are: the capability of minimising the number of steps to perform a complete Space Mission Analysis and Design; the ability to evaluate and display results instantaneously; the possibility to control all complex Space Mission subjects in a concurrent manner.

STARMAD aims to achieve cost reduction and quality improvements by streamlining the design process through improving engineer involvement, and hence his understanding and efficiency in designing a space mission.

Definition 
STARMAD is a Space Mission Analysis and Design tool, intended to enable users to quickly and easily perform the following tasks:

1. Preliminary Orbit Analysis, in terms of Dynamics, Geometry, Manoeuvre and Maintenance, Interplanetary Transfer, and Delta-V Budget. 
2. Observation Payload Analysis, in terms of Electromagnetic Spectrum, Optics and Sizing.
3. Spacecraft Subsystems Design, considering Attitude Control, Communications, Power System, Propulsion System, Structural Analysis and Thermal Control.
4. Launch and Transfer Vehicle Information.
5. Mission Operation Complexity, from the point of view of Mission Design and Planning, Flight System Design, Operational Risk Avoidance, Ground Systems.

Its main features are:
 Possibility to perform all, or only a subset of, the tasks listed above.
 Easy to use through the graphical user interface.
 Capability to concurrently analyse Space Mission aspects.
 Configuring STARMAD with an existing space mission and satellite, it is possible to check the effects that any modifications have on a Mission.
 Export data and possibility to generate a full Space Mission Report.

Problem modelling 
STARMAD is a tool allowing user to perform a Space Mission Analysis and Design   in a complete, simple and fast way.

It can be compared to an electronic handbook where you have just to insert the required inputs, press enter and see the results. 
The user does not need a large quantity of literature to analyse a space mission subject. Based on the task, STARMAD uses suitable formulas to find the solution.

Starting from the requirements, the engineer can carry out fundamental Space Mission Analyses, not only in terms of engineering parameters but also in terms of Mission Operations Complexity.  In addition, configuring STARMAD with an existing space mission and satellite, it is possible to test critical applied modifications.

Furthermore, it offers the possibility to work in a concurrent as well as in an independent way.

The System Algorithms technique is used to compute system performance. It applies the basic physical or geometric formulas associated with a particular system or process, such as those for determining resolution, size of an antenna, link budget, geometric coverage. System Algorithms provide the best method for computing performance, providing clear traceability and establishing the relationship between design parameters and performance characteristics. 
STARMAD computations are based on System Algorithms technique, additionally implementing all the design parameters interdependencies and automatically exchanging results throughout its sections. This allows to simplify and streamline the overall design process.
This method is powerful, showing how performance varies with key parameters. Limitation is the assumption of having correctly identified what limits system performance, such as optical quality, pointing stability, etc. Although this limitation, System Algorithms technique is ideal for preliminary assessment on space missions.

Concurrent approach 
In automatically linking all Space Mission aspects with their associated interdependencies, STARMAD is able to simplify an otherwise complex problem.
It facilitates a fast and effective interaction of all disciplines involved, ensuring consistent, high-quality results. The software is an efficient working tool to ensure consistent end-to-end design of a space mission.
The concurrent approach  will improve engineer involvement, and hence his/her understanding and efficiency in designing a space mission.

The spacecraft design process is based on mathematical models, which are implemented inside STARMAD. By this means, a consistent set of design parameters can be automatically defined and exchanged throughout the software sections and subsections. And any change, which may affect other disciplines, can immediately be identified and assessed. In this way, a number of design iterations can be performed, and different design options can easily be analysed and compared.
In such a way, via STARMAD, it will be possible to streamline the design process achieving cost reduction and quality improvements.

STARMAD software structure 
STARMAD is principally divided into five primary sections, each of which contain several subsections.

Through the Graphical User Interface (GUI), the user can define the type of problem. The Main User Interface is composed of 30 subsections (called pressing relative buttons). Each subsection can be configured with the required inputs and run independently from the others.

Going back to the main GUI, the user can solve several different concurrent space mission tasks calling other subsections and performing analyses in parallel taking under control the complexity of the problem. All the involved sections will take care of the performed evaluations and will automatically set their inputs based on the obtained results. This process will allow the user to concurrently design and analyse space mission subjects.

Every subsection has its own Output Section showing results, data and design summary when the simulation is performed. All results can be saved, stored, or re-loaded for modifications.

The content of each of the five primary sections is described below.

Orbit analysis

It is composed of the following sub-divisions:
 Orbit Dynamics evaluating basic spacecraft dynamics, orbit perturbations both atmospheric and gravitational;
 Orbit Geometry, where general coverage characteristics and target viewing are calculated;
 Orbit Manoeuvres and Maintenance for circular orbit. In this section, setting main input parameters, such as parking and operational orbit parameters, or re-phasing, de-orbit and end-of-life parameters, Orbit Manoeuvre outputs (orbit dynamics, Hohmann transfer, plane change, low-thrust spiral change) and Orbit Maintenance outputs (Dynamics, Atmospheric and Gravitational effects, Re-phasing, End-of-life Manoeuvre parameters) are evaluated;
 Interplanetary Orbit Transfer, where the main output parameters for an interplanetary transfer are evaluated under the hypothesis of patched conic approximation, such as velocity, energy, time of flight, delta-V to initiate and complete the transfer. For Earth departure, circular orbit is assumed. Heliocentric transfers are also considered;
 Delta-V and Geometry Budgets, calculating all the elements of the delta-V budget and Mapping and Pointing errors.

Observation payload analysis

It is subdivided in the sections:

 Electromagnetic Spectrum & Optics, where typical EM Spectrum and Optics parameters are determined, such as irradiance, emittance, swath-width, ground resolution.
 Observation Payload Sizing, where sizing of the observation instrument in terms of dimensions, mass and power is evaluated, as well as the payload data rate.

Spacecraft subsystems design
It is composed of all main subsystems required to build a satellite.
 Spacecraft preliminary sizing, in terms of mass, power, volume, area and moments of inertia of S/C body and solar array.
 Attitude control, composed of two sections:
- Torque estimates: where orbit characteristics, environmental torques and slew characteristics are calculated.
- Attitude control sizing: evaluating main parameters of Momentum wheel, Reaction wheel, Thrusters and Magnetic Torquer.
 Communications:
- Uplink: setting ground transmitter parameters, this section evaluates outputs for Ground and spacecraft transmitter, Geometry and Atmosphere perturbations, Link budget in terms of EIRP, space loss, atmospheric attenuation, rain attenuation, G/T, Antenna pointing losses, Eb/No, C/No, Margin.
- Downlink: setting the Spacecraft Transmitter parameters, this section evaluates outputs for Ground and Spacecraft transmitter, Geometry and Atmosphere perturbations, Link budget in terms of EIRP, space loss, atmospheric attenuation, rain attenuation, G/T, Antenna pointing losses, Eb/No, C/No, Margin.
 Power subsystem sizing, which is subdivided into 3 sections:
- Solar array;
- Secondary battery;
- Other primary sources
to calculate solar array mass and power budgets, battery capacity and mass, power and mass for fuel cells, solar thermal dynamics, radioisotope, nuclear reactor (if on board).
 Propulsion subsystem, composed of the following sections:
- Sizing, which principally calculates mass, power, mass flow rate, thrust for both chemical and electric propulsion system;
- Thermodynamics, evaluating specific impulses, combustion chamber and nozzle characteristics. Additionally, it performs a complete sizing for the liquid propulsion system;
- Storage and Feed, where oxidiser and fuel characteristics plus bulk density and volume are determined.
 Structural Analysis for:
- Monocoque Structure;
- Semi-Monocoque Structure
to calculate loads, axial and lateral deflections, stress, bending moment, margins of safety.
 Thermal control to perform analyses on the spacecraft body and solar array. Main parameters evaluated are: solar and albedo energy absorbed, maximum and minimum equilibrium temperature, maximum and minimum planet IR energy absorbed, possible changes in S/C to reduce maximum equilibrium temperature to specified upper limit, heater requirements during eclipse.
 System Sizing Summary resuming the main feature of the designed spacecraft.

Vehicle information
This software section gives an overview of the principal characteristics for existing launch and transfer vehicles. Possibility to implement a user-defined vehicle is incorporated in both sections (launchers and transfers).
 For Launchers: spacecraft loaded mass, performance (mass to orbit, available inclinations, injection accuracy, flight rate), reliability experience, payload compartment characteristics, frequency, accelerations and price are summarised.
 For Transfer Vehicles: delta-V capability, thrust, mass flow rate, specific impulse, burn time, and mass characteristics are computed.

Mission operation complexity
This section summarises the results of the Mission Operations Complexity investigation using NASA’s JPL model as described in the text “Cost Effective Space Mission Operations”.

It is divided into four subsections as follows:
 Mission Design and Planning: Science and Engineering, GNC and Tracking events are monitored in terms of frequency, criticality, data return, planning;
 Flight System Design: the operations complexity events are related to command, monitor, pointing, automation, flight margins;
 Operational Risk Avoidance: command and control, data return, performance analysis, fault recovery are taken into account;
 Ground Systems: interfaces and ground system complexity, design of the ground system, organisation and staffing, automation, are all considered in the evaluation of the mission operations complexity.
In each of these subsections, a level of complexity (high, medium, or low) is given for all the events related to the particular mission subject. The level of the total mission complexity and the predicted full-time equivalent manpower for efficient operations is given as a final output.

Mobile version
Smartphones and tablets usage are widely growing in all the technological fields, helping users in performing the most different activities just ‘on the go’. The increasing computational power of such devices can actually  allow also to perform complex analysis and therefore, they can be conceptually used in Space industry in helping users to build space missions, spacecraft, systems and products requiring quick solutions for system design and software development point of view.
"iStarmad" is the iDevice extension of STARMAD, and it is an app to perform preliminary end-to-end space mission analysis and spacecraft subsystems design using iPhone/iPad devices.

History
In 2007, STARMAD was created by Davide Starnone. For the following years, it was promoted all around the world through several International Conferences, such as the "IAC". Then the software has been sold around the world for 7 years. In 2014 "SSBV", a Dutch-led technology driven company active in the domains of (aero)Space and Defence & Security, acquired STARMAD that now is officially included in their portfolio.

References

External links
 STARMAD website
 STARMAD Brochure

Aerospace engineering software
Systems engineering
Astronomy software
Mathematical software
Physics software
Space science
Spaceflight
Business software for Windows